Ousmane Simon Pierre Alexandre Dia (born 17 July 1992) is a French professional footballer who plays as a forward.

Career
Dia began his career at Valenciennes. In October 2012, Dia signed on loan for Qatari club Lekhwiya. During his time at the club, Dia made four first team appearances for the club in the Qatar Stars League.

In January 2014, Dia signed for Amiens, making his debut against Dunkerque.

On 14 August 2015, Dia signed for his hometown club of Saint-Quentin, after rejecting an offer from Belgian club Seraing.

Personal life
Dia is the son of Ali Dia.

References

External links
 

1992 births
Living people
French footballers
People from Saint-Quentin, Aisne
Association football forwards
French sportspeople of Senegalese descent
Championnat National players
Qatar Stars League players
Simon Dia
Valenciennes FC players
Lekhwiya SC players
Amiens SC players
Olympique Saint-Quentin players
Entente SSG players
Simon Dia
Simon Dia
French expatriate footballers
Expatriate footballers in Qatar
Expatriate footballers in Thailand
French expatriate sportspeople in Qatar
French expatriate sportspeople in Thailand
Sportspeople from Aisne
Footballers from Hauts-de-France